Krásná is a municipality and village in Frýdek-Místek District in the Moravian-Silesian Region of the Czech Republic. It has about 700 inhabitants.

Geography
It lies in the valley of the Mohelnice river (a tributary of the Morávka). The municipality is situated in the Moravian-Silesian Beskids.

History
The first written mention of Krásná is from 1639. It was then a part of the Friedek state country, which was a part of the Kingdom of Bohemia, since 1526 a part of the Habsburg monarchy. After World War I and fall of Austria-Hungary it became a part of Czechoslovakia. In March 1939 it became a part of Protectorate of Bohemia and Moravia. After World War II it was restored to Czechoslovakia.

Twin towns – sister cities

Krásná is twinned with:
 Bziny, Slovakia
 Wilkowice, Poland

References

External links

 

Villages in Frýdek-Místek District
Cieszyn Silesia